Christian Frederik Møller (31 October 1898 – 5 November 1988), generally referred to as C. F. Møller, was a Danish architect, professor and, from 1965 to 1969, the first rector of the Aarhus School of Architecture. His former practice, Arkitektfirmaet C. F. Møller, which he founded in 1924, still exists and bears his name. It is today the largest architectural firm in Denmark with branch offices in several countries.

Biography
Christian Frederik Møller was born in Skanderborg, Denmark. He was the son of Valdemar Møller and Nielssine Dalby.

He first trained as a mason and later studied architecture at the Royal Danish Academy of Fine Arts in Copenhagen, graduating in 1920.
He conducted study trips to England (1925); Germany, Italy and France (1927); Germany, Switzerland and Italy (1937). He exhibited at the Charlottenborg Spring Exhibition during 1952–64, 1973, 1978, 1985.

He set up his own architectural office C.F. Møller in 1924, and in 1928 formed a partnership with the architect and Professor Kay Fisker (1893–1965) which lasted until 1942. After winning first prizes in the competitions for Aarhus Community Hospital in 1930 and Aarhus University in 1931, they established an office in Aarhus in 1932. Their buildings also include the apartment blocks 2 Vodroffsvej (1930) and Vestersøhus (1935–39) in Copenhagen, the latter of which has remained a major influence on Danish housing architecture.

Their winning proposal for Aarhus University consisted of individual faculty buildings arranged along the margin of an undulating park setting. The first building at the site was completed in 1933. By the early 40s, the collaboration with Fisker had ended and C. F. Møller was left to complete the Aarhus University alone. Møller was present at the construction site when the British Royal Air Force bombed the University dormitories, which were occupied by the Gestapo, on 31 October 1944. During the attack, a bomb accidentally struck the main building, and Møller was lightly injured as a result, while about ten members of the construction crew were killed. The main building was completed in 1946 and the so-called Book Tower in 1962.
Later works include Salling Department Store im Aarhus (1949, with Gunnar Krohn), Angligården (1965, later Herning Art Museum) and Egetæpper in Herning (1984).
Møller was Royal Building Inspector from 1953 to 1968, and in 1965 he became the first rector of the newly founded Aarhus School of Architecture.

Personal life
In 1928, he married Bodil Marie Jacobsen (1904-1996).

Selected projects  
 Aarhus Community Hospital, Aarhus, Denmark (with Kay Fisker)
 Aarhus University, Aarhus, Denmark (with Fisker and Povl Stegmann)
 2 Vodroffsvej, Copenhagen (1930, with Fisker)
 Vestersøhus, Copenhagen, Denmark (1935–39, with Fisker)
 Sønderjyllandshallen, Aabenraa, Denmark
 Centralinstitutionen Sølund, in Skanderborg, Denmark (1935)
 Salling Department Store, Aarhus, Denmark (1949, with Gunnar Krohn)
 Herning Art Museum, Herning, Denmark  (1964–1965)
 Pindstrup Church, Djursland, Denmark (1968)
 Kolding Hospital
 Middelfart Hospital

Honours 
 1945 Eckersberg Medal
 1947 C. F. Hansen Medal

Gallery
Aarhus University

Elsewhere

See also
 Architecture of Denmark

References

Further reading 
Nils-Ole Lund  (1998) Bygmesteren C.F. Møller (Aarhus Universitetsforlag)

External links 

The official C.F Møller homepage
The Herning Art Museum homepage
 C. F. Møller på gravsted.dk

Danish architects
1898 births
1988 deaths
Royal Danish Academy of Fine Arts alumni
Recipients of the Eckersberg Medal
Recipients of the C.F. Hansen Medal
Burials at Vestre Cemetery, Aarhus
People from Skanderborg Municipality